Manfred Grieser (born 9 May 1938) is a German athlete. He competed in the men's discus throw at the 1960 Summer Olympics.

References

External links
 

1938 births
Living people
Athletes (track and field) at the 1960 Summer Olympics
German male discus throwers
Olympic athletes of the United Team of Germany
Place of birth missing (living people)